Khao Sam Muk, is a 45 m (147.64 ft) high hill in Chonburi Province, Thailand.  It is in Chonburi city on Bangkok Bay between Ang Sila and Bang Saen Beach. There is a Chinese shrine of Mazu on the hilltop which affords views of the surrounding landscape, including Bang Saen Beach, and there is another shrine at the foot of the escarpment.  This shrine is a Thai shrine built according to the legend of this hill.

Legends and symbolism
Khao Sam Muk has symbolic significance in Chonburi. Local people believe that the spirit of that mountain protects fishers from harm. One legend tells that the wife of a fisherman waited on the hill for her husband who was lost at sea. Another legend tells that in the 18th century a poor Chinese girl named Sam Muk jumped to her death from the cliff after her parents objected to her marriage to her lover, becoming deified after her death. In some versions both the girl and her lover threw themselves from the escarpment. Sam Muk hill appears in somewhat stylized form in the provincial seal of Chonburi.

See also
List of mountains in Thailand
Chonburi Province
Seals of the provinces of Thailand

References

External links
Chonburi Official Website  

Geography of Chonburi province
Hills of Thailand
Tourist attractions in Chonburi province